Margaret Corbett may refer to:
 Margaret Darst Corbett, an American who taught the Bates method
 Misses Corbett, pseudonym of Scottish author